Triumph is an unincorporated community and census-designated place in Plaquemines Parish, Louisiana, United States. It is located on the south bank of the Mississippi River. As of the 2020 census, its population was 268.

It is the closest town to two National Historic Landmarks: Fort Jackson (down river from the town; though due to a bend in the river to the north east) and (across the river) Fort St. Philip.

The 1960 U.S Census listed Triumph as having a population of 900. Until 2010, the Census did not count Triumph as a separate community, including it as part of the census-designated place (CDP) of Buras-Triumph.

According to tradition, the community was named for its "triumph" over a rival town when they secured a post office.

Like most of Plaquemines Parish, Triumph was severely damaged by the massive storm surge from Hurricane Katrina in 2005.

Demographics

Education
Plaquemines Parish School Board operates the public schools of the parish.

It is served by South Plaquemines High School in Buras. Prior to 2005 Buras Middle School and Buras High School served the community, but Hurricane Katrina damaged the buildings.

References

Census-designated places in Plaquemines Parish, Louisiana
Unincorporated communities in Louisiana
Census-designated places in Louisiana
Louisiana populated places on the Mississippi River
Unincorporated communities in Plaquemines Parish, Louisiana
Census-designated places in New Orleans metropolitan area